Freeburg is an unincorporated community in Washington Township, Stark County, in the U.S. state of Ohio.

History
Freeburg was platted in 1842. Lack of railroad facilities inhibited the town's growth. A post office called Freeburgh was established in 1855, the name was changed to Freeburg in 1894, and the post office closed in 1906.

The Freeburg Cemetery (Latitude: 40.83572, Longitude: -81.14527) is also known as the Church of the Brethren Cemetery.

Geography
The community is located 6 miles east from OH-44 in Louisville, Ohio by OH-153 near the intersection of Beechwood Avenue Northeast (CR-105). The highest point in Stark County is located south of the community in Paris Township.

References

Unincorporated communities in Stark County, Ohio
Unincorporated communities in Ohio